Puro Desamor Volumen 1 is the first studio album by Mexican singer Zemmoa, released digitally and on vinyl on 15 June 2013.

Background 
Zemmoa created Zemmporio Records after being told by a record company that they were not ready for an artist playing with gender identity. Then she raised funds for the production of her album through the collective financing campaign #YOYAYTÚ on Fondeadora Arca platform.

Appearances
She collaborated with Absolut Vodka to create a cocktail inspired by her personality, "Black Berry Attraction by Zemmoa" within the Absolut Unique campaign.

She participated in the film Acapulco Sunset, directed by Lino Georg Von Saenger (2017) with the song "Un amor de verano" extracted from Puro Desamor Volumen 1, plus a special appearance in it. In Veintañera, divorciada y fantástica by Noé Santillán-López with the song «Mucha mujer para ti» where she also appears as herself interpreting it. She also collaborated on the soundtrack of the series Los Espookys of HBO with the song "Te enterraré el tacón".

Track listing

Videos 

 Zeuz
 Ya No Más
 Veneno
 Ay Mínimo Escribe Un Adiós
 Te Enterraré El Tacón

References 

2013 albums
Spanish-language albums